Kassala is the capital of the state of Kassala in eastern Sudan.  Its 2008 population was recorded to be 419,030. Built on the banks of the Gash River, it is a market town and is famous for its fruit gardens.

Many of its inhabitants are from the Hadendawa people.

The town was formerly a railroad hub, however, as of 2006 there was no operational railway station in Kassala and much of the track leading to and from the town has been salvaged or fallen into disrepair. Kassala's location along the main Khartoum-Port Sudan highway makes it an important trade center.

History

Neolithic 
The ancient settlement of Mahal Teglinos flourished here during the Early Gash Group phase (ca. 2800–2500 BC). Egyptian jars dating from this period have been found here. At that time, the inhabitants at Mahal Teglinos were already trading with Egypt, Nubia, and the southern Arabian Peninsula.

Mahal Teglinos settlement continued after that, and also flourished during the late Gash Group phase (ca. 1900–1700 BC).

Modern 
In the 18th and 19th centuries, the town was a key node in the west–east trade route, linking the coastal ports of Massawa and Suakin with the Sudan and farther west. The town was conquered by Ottoman soldiers of Egyptian viceroy Muhammad Ali in 1840 during his military offensive into Sudan. In 1885, Kassala was subsequently captured by the Mahdists. In 1894, after the Battle of Kassala the Italians captured the city from the Mahdists. In 1897, the Kingdom of Italy returned Kassala to the Kingdom of Egypt under British leadership, in order to get international recognition of the Italian colony of Eritrea. In 1899, Kassala fell under the purview of Anglo-Egyptian Sudan until Sudanese independence in 1956.

In July 1940, during the East African Campaign, Italian forces advancing from Italian East Africa forced the local British garrison to withdraw from Kassala.  The Italians then occupied the city with brigade-sized units: on July 4, 1940 the Italians started their offensive with 2,500 men (and one brigade of cavalry) supported by 24 tanks, while to defend Kassala for Britain there were 1,300 colonial soldiers with their British officers who -after some initial heavy fighting- were easily defeated. The Italians later appointed as mayor of Kassala the future hero of Eritrean independence, Hamid Idris Awate. In mid-January 1941, the Italians withdrew from the city and a British garrison returned.

Climate

Kassala has a hot desert climate (Köppen climate classification BWh).

Current status 

The Kassala region had a child mortality rate of 62 deaths per 1,000 live births in 2014, slightly higher than the national average of 52 child deaths per 1,000.

The Khatmiyya Mosque, built in 1840 by the Ottomans and damaged during the Mahdist War, is the city's most important cultural site.  It is an important site for the Sufi Khatmiyya order.

Education 

The city is home to Kassala University, a public university established in 1990 to replace the East University, and an important institution for development in the east of Sudan.
Including Faculty of Medicine and Health Sciences, Faculty of Education,Faculty of Economic and Administration, Faculty of Computer science and IT and more.

Notable people

 Bushara Abdel-Nadief (Footballer)
 Aisha Musa Ahmad (Singer)
 Hassan Al-Turabi (Politician)
 Muhannad El Tahir (Footballer)
 Nizar Hamid (Footballer)
 Noor Uthman Muhammed 
 Dua Saleh (Singer)

See also 

 2007 Sudan floods
 Railway stations in Sudan
 Toteil

References

External links 

 Kassala program, Ockenden International

State capitals in Sudan
Populated places in Kassala (state)